Judith Flanders (born 1959) is a historian, journalist and author, who has settled in London, England. Her writings centre on the Victorian period.

Early life
Flanders was born to Jewish parents in London, England. She spent her childhood in Montreal, Canada, apart from a year in Israel in 1972. She moved to Britain after university, and worked as an editor for various London publishers.

Her experiences have been satirized in a crime novel, Writers' Block (2014), retitled A Murder of Magpies (2015).

Writing
As an author, Flanders concentrates on the Victorian period. Her book, A Circle of Sisters followed the lives of four female siblings and The Invention of Murder investigated crime of the era. Recently she has served as a narrator, historian, and advisor for the Ubisoft video game Assassin's Creed Syndicate.

Flanders also writes as an arts critic, on books, dance, art, and recently video games. Her work has appeared in The Sunday Telegraph, The Guardian, The Spectator and The Times Literary Supplement.

A graduate of Skidmore College in Saratoga Springs, New York, Flanders is a Senior Research Fellow in Nineteenth Century Social History at the University of Buckingham.

Selected works

Nonfiction 

; in the USA as: 

Flanders, Judith (2014),The Making of Home: The 500-Year Story of How Our Houses Became Our Homes, Atlantic Books
Flanders, Judith (2017), Christmas: A Biography, St. Martin's Press,

Sam Clair novels 
 Flanders, Judith (2014), Writers' Block, Allison and Busby, ; published in the USA as (2015) A Murder of Magpies, St. Martin's Press, 
 Flanders, Judith (2015), A Bed of Scorpions, Allison and Busby
 Flanders, Judith (2017), A Cast of Vultures, St. Martin's Press, 
 Flanders, Judith (2018), A Howl of Wolves, St. Martin's Press,

References 

1959 births
Living people
Jewish historians
Journalists from Quebec
English women journalists
Canadian non-fiction writers
Canadian crime writers
Canadian women journalists
Canadian women non-fiction writers
Canadian literary critics
Women literary critics
Writers from Montreal
Women crime writers
English historians
Jewish Canadian journalists